Caetano Veloso is a Brazilian composer, singer and guitarist who has released over twenty studio albums and received various awards and nominations, including two Grammy Awards out of five nominations and eleven Latin Grammy Awards from twenty-eight nominations.

Veloso has received five Grammy Award nominations, including three for Best World Music Album, winning two of them for Livro in 2000 and João Voz e Violão in 2001.

At the Latin Grammy Awards, Veloso has won several times in the categories within the Portuguese language field, including Best MPB Album three times, Best Brazilian Song twice and Best Brazilian Rock Album once. Plus, he has been nominated for Album of the Year twice, for Livro in 2000 and Especial Ivete, Gil e Caetano in 2012 and for Song of the Year twice, for "Um Abraçaço" and "A Bossa Nova É Foda" in 2013 and 2014 respectively.

Additionally, he was received awards for his work in film scores, including the Grande Prêmio do Cinema Brasileiro for Best Score for Orfeu in 2000 and the Best Music award for O Quatrilho at the Havana Film Festival in 1995.

Grammy Awards
The Grammy Awards are presented annually by the Recording Academy to recognize achievement in the music industry.

Grande Prêmio do Cinema Brasileiro
The Grande Prêmio do Cinema Brasileiro is a Brazilian film award presented by the Academia Brasileira de Cinema.

Havana Film Festival
The Havana Film Festival is a Cuban festival focused on the promotion of Latin American cinema.

Latin Grammy Awards
The Latin Grammy Awards are an award presented annually by The Latin Recording Academy to recognize outstanding achievement in the Latin music industry.

Note: At the 2nd Annual Latin Grammy Awards, Noites Do Norte won Best Engineered Album, the award went to the engineer of the album, Moogie Canazio and Marcelo Sabóia.
Note: At the 14th Annual Latin Grammy Awards, Abraçaço also won Best Recording Package, the award went to the art directors of the album, Tonho Quinta-Feira and Fernando Young.

MTV Video Music Brasil
The MTV Video Music Brazil were an annual award ceremony presented by MTV Brasil to recognize the best in music, pop culture and online culture chosen by MTV viewers.

Premios Ondas
The Premios Ondas are Spanish awards given by Radio Barcelona in recognition of professionals in the fields of radio and television broadcasting, the cinema, and the music industry.

Troféu Imprensa
The Troféu Imprensa an award presented annually by the Sistema Brasileiro de Televisão.

References 

Veloso, Caetano